Andrew Paul Drake known as Andi (born 1965), is a male former athlete who competed for England.

Athletics career
He became the British champion in 1999 after winning the British 10,000 metres walk title.

He represented England in the 20,000 meter walk event, at the 1998 Commonwealth Games in Kuala Lumpur, Malaysia.

References

1965 births
Living people
English male racewalkers
Athletes (track and field) at the 1998 Commonwealth Games
Commonwealth Games competitors for England